The Seima-Turbino phenomenon is a pattern of burial sites with similar bronze artifacts dated to ca. 2300-1700 BC (2017 dated from 2100 BC to 1900 BC, 2007 dated to 1650 BC onwards) found across northern Eurasia, particularly Siberia and Central Asia, maybe from Fennoscandia to Mongolia, Northeast China, Russian Far East, Korea, and Japan. The homeland is considered to be the Altai Mountains. These findings have suggested a common point of cultural origin, possession of advanced metal working technology, and unexplained rapid migration. The buried were nomadic warriors and metal-workers, traveling on horseback or two-wheeled carts.

The name derives from the Seyma cemetery near the confluence of the Oka River and Volga River, first excavated around 1914, and the Turbino cemetery in Perm, first excavated in 1924.

Origin
Seima-Turbino (ST) weapons contain tin bronze ore originating from the Altai Mountains region (central Mongolia and southern Siberia), with further ST discoveries pointing more specifically to the southeastern portions of the Altai and Xinjiang. These sites have been identified with the origin of the mysterious ST culture.

Artifacts and weapons 
The bronzes found were technologically advanced for the time, including lost wax casting, and showed high degree of artist input in their design. Horses were the most common shapes for the hilts of blades. Weapons such as spearheads with hooks, single-bladed knives and socketed axes with geometric designs traveled west and east from Xinjiang.

Dispersal 
The culture spread from the Altai mountains to the west and to the east.

These cultures are noted for being nomadic forest and steppe societies with metal working, sometimes without having first developed agricultural methods. The development of this metalworking ability appears to have occurred quite quickly.

ST bronzes have been discovered as far west as the Baltic Sea and the Borodino treasure in Moldavia.

Theories

Transmission into Southeast Asia 
It has been conjectured that changes in climate in this region around 2000 BC and the ensuing ecological, economic and political changes triggered a rapid and massive migration westward into northeast Europe, eastward into Korea, and southward into Southeast Asia (Vietnam and Thailand) across a frontier of some 4,000 miles. Supposedly this migration took place in just five to six generations and enabled people from Finland in the west to Thailand in the east to employ the same metal working technology and in some areas, horse breeding and riding.

However, further excavations and research in Ban Chiang and Ban Non Wat (both Thailand) argue the idea that Seima-Turbino brought metal workings into southeast Asia is based on inaccurate and unreliable radiocarbon dating at the site of Ban Chiang. It is now agreed by virtually every specialist in Southeast Asian prehistory that the Bronze Age of Southeast Asia occurred too late to be related to ST, and the cast bronzes are quite different.

Uralic urheimat 

The same authors conjectured that the same migrations spread the Uralic languages across Europe and Asia.

The existence of Uralic Samoyedic and Ob-Ugrian groups like the Nenets, the Mansi people and the Khanty, anchor the Uralic languages in Asia.

Notable is the similarity between the range of haplogroup N3a3’6, especially in the western part of Eurasia and the distribution of the Seima-Turbino trans-cultural phenomenon during the interval of 4.2–3.7 kya. Carriers of N3a1-B211, the early branch of N3a, could have migrated to the eastern fringes of Europe by the same Seima-Turbino groups. However earlier migrations cannot be ruled out either; a study of ancient DNA revealed a 7,500-year-old influx from Siberia to northeast Europe.

Another subclade of Y-haplogroup N, N1a2b-P43 (TMRCA 4,700 [95% CI 3,800 <-> 5,600] ybp), reaches some of its highest frequencies among the Uralic-speaking Nenets, Nganasan, Khanty, and Mansi peoples in western Siberia. Haplogroup N1a2b-P43 is also often observed among the members of many Uralic- or Turkic-speaking ethnic minorities of European Russia, but it is very rare among the Baltic Finnic and Samic peoples of Northern Europe. Estimated to be approximately 4,700 years old, N1b spread north and westwards from its original locus in Southern Siberia, exactly as Seima-Turbino migration did.

Citations

Further reading

Burials
Altai Mountains
Nomadic groups in Eurasia
Archaeology of Central Asia